Russ Chimes is an English producer, remixer and DJ based in London, who produced a song titled "Back 2 You" and had a UK No. 40 hit with "Turn Me Out".

Select discography

As lead artist

Remixes

References

English DJs
Year of birth missing (living people)
Living people